General elections were held in the Pitcairn Islands on 12 December 2011.

Results
Simon Young was re-elected Deputy Mayor whilst the five members elected to the Island Council were:
Jay Warren
Brenda Christian
Michelle Christian
Jacqui Christian
Kerry Young

References

Pitcairn
Pitcairn
Elections in the Pitcairn Islands
General election
Pitcairn general election,2011
December 2011 events in Oceania